Clarence Hanford "Red" Munson (July 31, 1883 – February 19, 1957) was a catcher in Major League Baseball. He played for the Philadelphia Phillies in 1905.

References

External links

1883 births
1957 deaths
Major League Baseball catchers
Philadelphia Phillies players
Minor league baseball managers
Charleston Sea Gulls players
Akron Rubbernecks players
Augusta Tourists players
Dayton Veterans players
Canton Watchmakers players
Norfolk Tars players
Nashville Vols players
Bristol Boosters players
Baseball players from Cincinnati
Paris Bourbonites players